X23–Saroni Factory Team is a Czech UCI Continental cycling team established in 2015.

References

UCI Continental Teams (Europe)
Cycling teams established in 2015
Cycling teams based in the Czech Republic